Wigston, or Wigston Magna, is a town and unparished area in the Oadby and Wigston district, in Leicestershire, England, just south of Leicester on the A5199. It had a population of 32,321 in 2011.

Geography
To the west along the B582, or Blaby Road is South Wigston,. Wigston is the largest of Leicester's satellite towns.

The Grand Union Canal runs along a southern route below Wigston from Newton Harcourt , Kilby Bridge , and for several miles through South Wigston, Glen Parva , Blaby  and on towards Leicester.

Wigston's population of approximately 32,000 live in both the post-war private suburban housing estates surrounding the old town centre, and the 19th century buildings now sandwiched between modern housing developments. The oldest of the post-war developments is Wigston Fields north of Wigston towards Knighton and Leicester; the Meadows and Little Hill estates were developed in the 1970s and 1980s to the east and south of Wigston's old centre. Wigston Harcourt is an area of housing developed up until the early 1990s between the Little Hill and Meadows estates. These three estates mark the boundary of the greater Leicester urban area, beyond which lies agricultural land.

History
One of the earliest records of Wigston is in the Domesday book as Wichingstone in the ancient wapentake of Guthlaxton, listed amongst the lands held by Hugh de Grandmesnil for the King.

In the Middle Ages it was known as Wigston Two Spires as, unusually, there were two mediaeval churches there, All Saints' and St Wistan's.

St Wistan's is so called because it was one of the places where the body of St Wistan or Wigstan rested before burial. Wigstan was a Mercian prince who was assassinated, but was regarded as a martyr. He was initially buried at Repton, but his body was then moved to Evesham.

It was the birthplace of George Davenport, a notorious highwayman; Abigail Herrick, the mother of Jonathan Swift, author of Gulliver's Travels; former Leicester Tigers and England scrum-half Harry Ellis who attended Bushloe High School; and former Leicester Sound and BBC Radio Leicester presenter, Mark Hayman. Graham Chapman, of Monty Python fame, lived (around 1951/52) in what was then Wigston police station, (the building on the corner of Pullman Road – opposite the swimming baths) during the time that his father was the inspector there. He attended South Wigston Junior School. Author and journalist John Marquis was born in Wigston and educated at Abington and Guthlaxton schools. The Leicester City footballer Howard Riley was also Wigston born and bred. Composer and piano virtuoso Michael Garrett was educated at Guthlaxton school. The music hall star Gertie Gitana is buried in Wigston cemetery, having been married for many years to local theatrical impresario Don Ross, who was born in the town. She died in the 1950s, having been a showbiz celebrity in the early years of the 20th century. Another Guthlaxton pupil was prominent policeman Geoffrey Barrett, who received a Governor's commendation as a member of the Hong Kong anti-corruption squad in the 1970s and ended his career as head of the Leicester murder squad.

Bushloe House, presently the offices of Oadby and Wigston Borough Council, was originally a c1850 house which was extended in c1880.  The interior decoration of the house and the design of most of the furniture (and possibly the design of the extension) was carried out by Christopher Dresser for the owner, his solicitor, Hiram Abiff Owston (1830–1905).

Henry Davis Pochin the manufacturing chemist who later owned the Bodnant Estate (now the National Trust's Bodnant Garden) was born in Wigston, son of another notable householder William Pochin.

There is a Framework Knitting Museum here, as it was an important occupation in this area from the 17th to 19th centuries.  Hosiery manufacture continued to be an important industry in the town after the decline of hand process of framework knitting with manufacturing firms such as Two Steeples, George Deacon and sons, Wigston Co-Operative Hosiers, A H Broughton and William Holmes. In neighbouring South Wigston Henry Bates was the leading hosiery manufacturer.

Wigston was the subject of W. G. Hoskins's pioneering historical study, The Midland Peasant (London: Macmillan, 1965), which traced the social history of this village from earliest recorded history into the 19th century.

Economy

Since the 1980s Wigston's retail economy has become increasingly dependent on national retailers. Up to 50% of retail in the town belongs to supermarkets and chain stores. The share of local business has caused local and independent businesses to close. This followed the trend of the 1990s homogenisation of British high streets.

McDonald's, Sainsbury's, Peacocks, Boots, Poundland, Iceland, Superdrug, Farmfoods, Aldi, B&Q, Wetherspoons, Subway, Greggs, and Ladbrookes all hold businesses around the town centre or nearby. One particular unit in the town centre became a branch of International Stores in the late 1970s and was later successively a Gateway Foodmarket, Solo (a Gateway Foodmarket re-brand), Kwik Save, Somerfield, then Kwik Save and Somerfield again, before becoming vacant in late 2007. This unit was re-opened in July 2009 as a branch of Wilko which relocated from Long Street.

Sainsbury's opened a store on Bell Street in 1980 which stands on the site of Bell Street Primary School. There are also a number of independent stores including several charity shops, two car dealerships, hair and beauty salons, opticians, florists, fish and chip shop, newsagents, and public houses.

On 22 January 2013 the Midlands Co-operative announced that eight of their department stores were to close, one of those being the Wigston department store. which closed in June 2013, although part of the unit was converted into a Co-op food store which itself closed in June 2016, the unit that was previously the department store is now home to Peacocks (features the local post office), Edinburgh Woollen Mill, Ponden Homes and Poundland.

In January 2022, W.H.Cox greengrocers located on Leicester Road (opposite Bell Street) announced it would be closing after trading for 134 years.

Education
There are numerous primary schools in Wigston including All Saints Primary School, Glenmere Primary School, Little Hill Primary School, The Meadow Community Primary School, Thythorn Field Community Primary School and Water Leys Primary School.

Wigston Academy is the secondary school for the area. It was formed in September 2015 from the merger of Abington Academy and Bushloe High School. Wigston College (formerly known as Guthlaxton College) is the post-16 provider for the area. Both institutions are part of Wigston Academies Trust.

Wigston Birkett House Community Special School is a special school located in the town that serves the wider area.
 
South Leicestershire College is a large further education provider for the area. It was rebuilt on Canal Street, South Wigston in 2010.

1461 (Wigston) Squadron of the Air Training Corps is located in Tigers Road, South Wigston, and recruits many members from the schools in Wigston.

Transportation
South Wigston railway station lies on the Birmingham to Peterborough Line. Trains to Leicester run every hour and take five minutes.

Wigston Magna and the surrounding estates are served by bus services operated by Arriva Midlands and Centrebus.

References

External links
 Borough of Oadby and Wigston
Wigston Library
 The Wigston Historical Society's website

Towns in Leicestershire
Unparished areas in Leicestershire
Oadby and Wigston